Zhegao is a town in Chaohu, Anhui, China.

History
In the Warring States (475 BC–221 BC) period, it was under the jurisdiction of Chu State (1115 BC–223 BC) and then Wu State (12th century BC–473 BC).

In the Han dynasty (202 BC–220 AD), it was under the jurisdiction of Tuogao County of Jiujiang Prefecture.

In the Tang dynasty (618–907), it was known as "Tuogao Town" and came under the jurisdiction of Chao County.

In the South Song dynasty (1127–1279), the Song and Jin armies fought in the town, known as the Zhegao War in the history of China.

In 1957, it was incorporated as a town. In 1958 it became a People's Commune. In 1983, it was changed to a township. In 1992, it was upgraded to a town. On 23 July, affected by the continuous heavy rainfall, the water level of the Zhegao River rose and streets of the town were submerged.

Administrative division
As of 2017, the town is divided into two communities and sixteen villages: 
 West Street Community
 East Street Community
 Xingba
 Sanxing
 Jianhe
 Sima
 Gongmin
 Dashuliu
 Jieyin'an
 Jinqi
 Xinghuo
 Hepu
 Ershan
 Banqiao
 Datang
 Wangqiao
 Wuxing
 Shuangquan

Geography

Zhegao River passes through the town.

Economy
Rice and wheat are the main food crops in the town. Pigs, vegetables and honey are the main agricultural income.

Transport
The National Highway G312 passes across the town south to north.

G5011 Wuhu-Hefei Expressway is a northwest–southeast highway in the town.

Zhegao railway station serves the town.

Notable people
 , politician in the Ming dynasty (1368–1644).
 Tang Maogang, politician in the Qing dynasty (1644–1911).
 Yang Yuren, politician in the Qing dynasty (1644–1911).
 , vice-president of the Examination Yuan.
 Zhou Yibing, lieutenant general of the People's Liberation Army.
 Ma Subing, professor at the Central Party School of the Chinese Communist Party.
 Cheng Guocai, professor at the PLA National Defence University.
 Kan Jiamin, Chinese-American scientist.
 Gao Zhi, translator.

References

Towns in Anhui
Divisions of Chaohu